is a Shinto shrine which enshrines Sugawara no Michizane as Tenjin. There are about 14,000 such shrines in Japan; famous examples include:

 Dazaifu Tenmangū (Dazaifu, Fukuoka) -- One of the Sōhonsha (head shrines) of Tenman-gū
 Kitano Tenmangū (Kamigyo, Kyoto) -- Another Sōhonsha of Tenman-gū
 Nagaoka Tenmangū (Nagaokakyo, Kyoto)
 Misode Tenmangū (Onomichi, Hiroshima)
 Osaka Tenmangū (Kita-ku, Osaka)
 Hōfu Tenmangū (Hofu, Yamaguchi)
 Yabo Tenmangū (Kunitachi, Tokyo)
 Yamada Tenmangū, Nagoya
 Yushima Tenmangū (Bunkyo, Tokyo)
 Kameido Tenjin Shrine (Koto, Tokyo)

Dazaifu Tenman-gū and Kitano Tenmangū are often grouped together with another of these shrines and called the "Three Great Tenjin Shrines", but there is no generally accepted criterion for the selection of a third shrine.

References 

Shinto shrines in Japan
Tenjin faith